The Windy Range is a subrange of the Big Bend Ranges of the Selkirk Mountains of the Columbia Mountains in southeastern British Columbia, Canada, located on the west side of Columbia Reach, Kinbasket Lake north of Windy Creek.

References

Windy Range in the Canadian Mountain Encyclopedia

Big Bend Ranges